Neil McBain (15 November 1895 – 13 May 1974) was a Scottish professional footballer and football manager. He remains the oldest player to appear in an English Football League match aged 51 years.

Playing career

Club
McBain, a wing half, began his senior football career in the summer of 1914, joining Ayr United, with whom he made his league debut on 20 March 1915 against Clyde. He served in the Black Watch and then transferred to the Royal Navy during World War I. He moved to Manchester United in November 1921 for a fee of £4,600.

In January 1923, after 42 league games for United, McBain moved to Everton, costing the Goodison Park side £4,200. He played 97 league games for Everton, leaving in July 1926 to join St Johnstone for a fee of £1,100.

He returned to Merseyside in March 1928, joining Liverpool, but played only 12 times before joining Watford in November the same year.

International
His Scotland international debut came in April 1922 while he was with Manchester United, in a 1–0 victory against England at Villa Park. He won two further caps while with Everton, in 1923 against Ireland and in 1924 against Wales.

Coaching and managerial career
He was appointed player-manager of Watford in 1929, retiring as a player in 1931 after playing 85 times for Watford. He left Watford in August 1937 and took over as manager of Ayr United later that year. In June 1938 he returned to England, as manager of Luton Town, but left Luton in June 1939.

He was appointed as manager of New Brighton in June 1946. On 15 March 1947, New Brighton had an injury crisis, particularly among their goalkeepers. With no other option McBain played in goal against Hartlepool United at the age of 51 years and 120 days (and almost exactly 32 years after his professional debut). He was sacked by New Brighton in February 1948 with the club bottom of the league. Later that month he joined Leyton Orient as assistant to Charlie Hewitt, but in August 1948 took over as manager after Hewitt left to rejoin Millwall. In August 1949, McBain left Orient to manage Argentine side Estudiantes de La Plata.

McBain returned to Ayr United, as manager, in 1955, taking the club to promotion as Scottish Division Two runners-up in 1956, but in August 1956 left to manage Watford for a second time, his second spell lasting until February 1959.

His final spell as a manager came again at Ayr United, between 1962 and 1963. He died in 1974, aged 78.

References

Sources

Jones, Trefor (1996). The Watford Football Club Illustrated Who's Who. T.G. Jones. p. 268. .
Emms, Steve; Wells, Richard (2007). Scottish Football League Players' Records 1890/91 to 1938/39. Tony Brown. .

1895 births
1974 deaths
Scottish footballers
Scotland international footballers
Scottish expatriate football managers
Hamilton Academical F.C. players
Ayr United F.C. players
Manchester United F.C. players
Everton F.C. players
St Johnstone F.C. players
Liverpool F.C. players
Watford F.C. players
Scottish football managers
Watford F.C. managers
Ayr United F.C. managers
Luton Town F.C. managers
New Brighton A.F.C. managers
New Brighton A.F.C. players
Leyton Orient F.C. managers
Estudiantes de La Plata managers
Black Watch soldiers
Royal Navy sailors
Royal Navy personnel of World War I
People from Campbeltown
Scottish Football League managers
Association football wing halves
Association football coaches
Outfield association footballers who played in goal
Sportspeople from Argyll and Bute
Scottish Football League players
English Football League players